Mavana (also Romanized as Mavānā, Mawāna, and Movānā; also known as Mavāneh) is a village in Targavar Rural District of Silvaneh District of Urmia County, West Azerbaijan province, Iran. At the 2006 National Census, its population was 1,134 in 179 households. The following census in 2011 counted 1,114 people in 219 households. The latest census in 2016 showed a population of 1,314 people in 275 households; it was the largest village in its rural district.

While historically Assyrian, the village is populated by Herki Kurds today.

Gallery

See also
 Assyrians in Iran
 List of Assyrian settlements

References 

Urmia County

Populated places in West Azerbaijan Province

Populated places in Urmia County

Assyrian settlements

Kurdish settlements in West Azerbaijan Province